Timor Leste competed at the 2022 Winter Olympics in Beijing, China, from 4 to 20 February 2022. Timor Leste is making its third consecutive appearance at the Winter Olympic Games.

The Timor-Leste team consisted of one male alpine skier. Yohan Goutt Gonçalves was the country's flagbearer during the opening ceremony. Goutt Goncalves was also the flagbearer during the closing ceremony.

Competitors
The following is the list of number of competitors that participated at the Games per sport/discipline.

Alpine skiing

By meeting the basic qualification standards, Timor Leste qualified one male alpine skier. Yohan Goutt Gonçalves is scheduled to represent Timor-Leste for the third consecutive Winter Olympics.

See also
Tropical nations at the Winter Olympics

References

Nations at the 2022 Winter Olympics
2022
Winter Olympics